W.R. Kaufman & Son was an architectural firm in Texas.

Several of its works are listed on the National Register of Historic Places.

Works include:
Central Fire Station, 203 W. Foster Pampa, TX Kaufman, W.R. & Son 
Combs-Worley Building, 120 W. Kingsmille Pampa, TX Kaufman, W.R. & Son 
Gray County Courthouse, 205 N. Russell Pampa, TX Kaufman, W.R., & Son 
Pampa City Hall, 200 W. Foster Pampa, TX Kaufman, W.R. & Son 
White Deer Land Company Building, 116 S. Cuyler Pampa, TX Kaufman & Berry

See also
Union County Courthouse, Court St. Clayton, NM Kaufman,D.P. & Son

Defunct architecture firms based in Texas